Dragon Lady is a 2019 Philippine television drama fantasy series starring Janine Gutierrez and Tom Rodriguez. The series premiered on GMA Network's Afternoon Prime and Sabado Star Power sa Hapon block and worldwide on GMA Pinoy TV from March 4, 2019 to July 20, 2019, replacing Asawa Ko, Karibal Ko.

Series overview

Episodes

March 2019

April 2019

May 2019

June 2019

July 2019

References

Lists of Philippine drama television series episodes